The 1935 Santa Clara Broncos football team was an American football team that represented Santa Clara University as an independent during the 1935 college football season. In their seventh season under head coach Maurice J. "Clipper" Smith, the Broncos compiled a 3–6 record and outscored opponents by 82 to 69.

Schedule

References

Santa Clara
Santa Clara Broncos football seasons
Santa Clara Broncos football